How Do You Do? is the second single taken from beFour's debut album All 4 One, it was released as a double A-side single with "All 4 One", in Germany, Austria and Switzerland. The song is an English Language cover of the Russian song Kanikuly by Bum. Cover of this song was also created by Boom and in Vietnamese by HKT.

Formats and track listings
These are the formats and track listings of major single releases of "How Do You Do?".

Maxi CD single
 How Do You Do? - 3:09
 All 4 One - 3:40
 All 4 One (Karaoke Version) - 3:40
 Video - 3:40

Digital Download
 How Do You Do? - 3:09
 All 4 One - 3:40
 All 4 One (Karaoke Version) - 3:40

Charts

Weekly charts

Year-end charts

References

2007 songs
BeFour songs